Elías Alejandro Ramos Castillo (born 19 September 1998) is a Peruvian footballer who plays as a right-back for Peruvian Primera División side FBC Melgar.

Ramos is nicknamed El Zorro which means The Fox.

Career

Club career
Ramos is a product of Esther Grande and Sport Boys. He got his professional debut for Sport Boys on 23 April 2017 against Unión Huaral in the Peruvian Primera División. Since his debut, he became a regular starter and made 23 league appearances throw the year. After a good season, he signed a contract extension for one year in December 2017. In his second season, Ramos made a total of 24 appearances for Sport Boys.

In January 2019, Ramos joined fellow league club Alianza Universidad. He made 30 league appearances in his first season. After 52 appearances, Ramos left the club at the end of 2020 to join FBC Melgar for the 2021 season. The deal was confirmed on 10 December 2020.

References

External links
 

People from Pisco, Peru
Living people
1998 births
Peruvian footballers
Association football defenders
Peruvian Primera División players
Esther Grande footballers
Sport Boys footballers
Alianza Universidad footballers
FBC Melgar footballers